The Windham School District (WSD) is a non-geographical school district that provides educational services to inmates in the custody of the Texas Department of Criminal Justice (TDCJ). The district has its headquarters in Building B in the Wynne Unit in Huntsville. The school district is a separate and distinct organization from the TDCJ. Windham is one of the largest correctional education systems in the United States, providing educational programs and services in most TDCJ facilities. The Texas Board of Criminal Justice acts as the board of education for the district. The members of the board are appointed by the Governor of Texas.

History

George Beto, the director of the Texas Department of Corrections (TDC), advocated for the establishment of the district. The Texas Legislature established the district, which began operation in 1969. The Texas Board of Corrections named the district after James M. Windham, who had been a member of the board for 24 years. The district was the first school system of  its size to be established within a statewide prison system.

References

External links

 Windham School District
 
 

School districts in Texas